Discography was released on 27 March 2003 and is a compilation album from Swedish pop and country singer Jill Johnson. It peaked at number four on the Swedish Albums Chart.

Track listing
Crazy in Love - 3:00
Desperado - 3:38
What's Wrong with You - 4:41
Good Girl - 3:04
Moonlight and Roses - 3:21
Jump in a Car - 3:43
Just Like You Do - 3:40
Luckiest People - 4:16
Mothers Jewel - 3:38
My Love for You - 4:40
Secrets in my Life - 3:29
It's too Late - 3:20
Everybody's Confidante - 4:07
I'll Be There (with Michael Ruff) - 4:12
Kärleken är - 3:00
Tell Me Why 4:05 (with Annika Ljungberg)
Jag har havet ett stenkast från mig - 3:33
Kommer tid, kommer vår - 4:39
All Kinds of People 3:31
Shake the Sugartree - 3:17

Charts

Weekly charts

Year-end charts

References

Jill Johnson albums
2003 compilation albums